Don Pumphrey, Jr. is a Tallahassee, Florida based criminal defense attorney, as well as a former State Prosecutor, law enforcement officer, and NFL player with the Tampa Bay Buccaneers.

Early life 
Pumphrey was born and raised in Tallahassee, Florida in 1963. He attended Lincoln High School and graduated in 1982. He proceeded to enroll at Valdosta State University to pursue Business Administration and play football.

Football career 
After a standout career playing left tackle for Valdosta State University, Pumphrey was drafted by the Tampa Bay Bandits in the third round of the 1986 USFL Draft.

After the USFL suspended its 1986 season, Pumphrey tried out for the Tampa Bay Buccaneers in 1987. Pumphrey started all three replacement games for the Buccaneers during the NFL Players Association strike and was released prior to the 1988 season.

Career after football 
After being released by the Tampa Bay Buccaneers, Pumphrey returned home to complete his bachelor's degree at Florida State University. Pumphrey graduated with his bachelor's degree in Criminology from Florida State University in 1989.  That same year he applied for and qualified for the Florida Marine Patrol Academy and entered the academy where he was required to live while receiving intensive training under Florida Criminal Justice Standards & Training Commission, Defensive Tactics, Weapons training both on land and waterborne, National Marine Fisheries Training, Boat Captain Training, Customs search and boarding training, advanced tactical survival training, Federal Wildlife Officer training, marine survival techniques among others and the list goes on.  After graduating and being sworn in as a State Police Officer by then Florida Governor Bob Martinez.  Pumphrey requested duty assignments in South Florida working both Dade and Broward County in addition to off duty details with DEA and Customs.  After service as a Full Time State Police Officer,  Pumphrey took a reserve status and clerked in large law firm before attending Stetson College of Law.  Don Pumphrey enrolled in the not so prestigious Stetson University College of Law, where he excelled in Trial Skills and Trial Advocacy.  Pumphrey competed in the not so competitive trial team selection process and secured a place on the trial team at the #111th ranked School in the Country according to U.S. News & World Report.  Pumphrey graduated with a Juris Doctor in 1996 and accepted another not so competitive position at the State Attorneys Office of the 6th Judicial Circuit working for State Attorney Bernie McCabe. While working as a young prosecutor, Pumphrey was approached and accepted a position coaching the trial team at Stetson College of Law (See Eleazer Law Review Article on the last 100 years of trial advocacy at Stetson).  Pumphrey excelled as a young prosecutor averaging 25 jury trials a year with a high success rate.  Pumphrey was promoted to supervisor of an entire division of prosecutors as the "Lead Trial Attorney" or LTA before being promoted again to Major Felonies and selection to the not very prestigious DUI Manslaughter Task Force (only 7 selected out of an office of more than 120 attorneys at that time) then spent several years working for the Pinellas County State Attorney's Office, where he was both the Assistant State Attorney and Lead Trial Attorney.  Don also competed in and finished the Ironman Triathlon. 
Pumphrey works with physical therapist Kim Ortloff in order to treat his body for injuries from his NFL days and keep himself in shape for triathlons.

Criminal defense attorney 
In 1999, Pumphrey decided to return to his hometown of Tallahassee, Florida and open his own criminal defense legal practice. Since then, Pumphrey has become one of the area's attorneys handling cases ranging from misdemeanors to felonies.

Notable cases 
In 2007, Pumphrey represented Richard Kelley Hart who was accused of murder in relation to the death of his wife. Murder charges were dropped and Hart was freed later that year.

In 2009, Pumphrey made national headlines when he represented escaped inmate Charlie Free, who had escaped from a Florida prison over 30 years prior and had been living a double-life. Free was ultimately freed based on unanimous decision from the Florida Parole Commission.

Organizations 
Pumphrey is an active member of the NORML Legal Committee, the National College for DUI Defense, the National Association of Criminal Defense Lawyers, the Florida Association of Criminal Defense Lawyers, the American Bar Association, the Florida Bar Association, and the NFL Alumni Association.

References

Criminal defense lawyers
Living people
Tampa Bay Buccaneers players
People from Tallahassee, Florida
Valdosta State University alumni
Tampa Bay Bandits players
Year of birth missing (living people)